Speaking of Animals and Their Families is a 1942 American short comedy film directed by Robert Carlisle and Jerry Fairbanks. In 1943, at the 15th Academy Awards, it won an Oscar for Best Short Subject (One-Reel). It is part of a series of Speaking of Animals short films featuring animals given voice via special effects. The film series includes Speaking of Animals:  In a Harem and Speaking of Animals: Tails of the Border.

Cast
 Gayne Whitman as Narrator

References

External links

1942 films
1942 comedy films
1942 short films
American black-and-white films
Paramount Pictures short films
American comedy short films
Films about birds
Films about families
Live Action Short Film Academy Award winners
1940s American films